Frank Gray Jr. (February 25, 1908 – September 6, 1978) was a United States district judge of the United States District Court for the Middle District of Tennessee.

Education and career

Born in Franklin, Tennessee, Gray received a Bachelor of Laws from Cumberland School of Law in 1928. He was in private practice of law in Franklin from 1928 to 1961. He was Mayor of Franklin from 1947 to 1961.

Federal judicial service

Gray received a recess appointment from President John F. Kennedy on November 20, 1961, to the United States District Court for the Middle District of Tennessee, to a new seat created by 75 Stat. 80. He was nominated to the same seat by President Kennedy on January 15, 1962. He was confirmed by the United States Senate on February 7, 1962, and received his commission on February 17, 1962. He served as Chief Judge from 1970 to 1977. He assumed senior status on July 15, 1977. His service was terminated on September 6, 1978, due to his death in Franklin.

References

Sources
 

1908 births
1978 deaths
Mayors of places in Tennessee
Judges of the United States District Court for the Middle District of Tennessee
United States district court judges appointed by John F. Kennedy
20th-century American judges
20th-century American lawyers